"Big Energy" is a song by American rapper Latto. It was released through Streamcut and RCA Records on September 24, 2021, as the lead single from Latto's second studio album, 777 (2022). It was written by Latto, A1 LaFlare, Jaucquez Lowe, Randall Hammers, Theron Thomas, Dr. Luke, and Vaughn Oliver, with the latter two handling the production. Adrian Belew, Chris Frantz, Steven Stanley, and Tina Weymouth received songwriting credits since the song samples Tom Tom Club's 1981 song "Genius of Love". "Big Energy" has been described as pop and funk-rap.

A remix with American singer Mariah Carey featuring DJ Khaled was released on March 28, 2022, with an interpolation of Carey's song "Fantasy", which also heavily samples "Genius of Love". "Big Energy" earned Latto her highest-charting song on the US Billboard Hot 100, peaking at number three in April 2022. Consequently, it became the highest-charting solo song by a female rapper since March 2021. It also reached the top 10 in Australia and Canada, and top 20 in New Zealand. "Big Energy" became Latto's breakthrough on mainstream radio, and she performed the song live on several television appearances. The remix was nominated for the Song of the Summer Award at the 2022 MTV Video Music Awards. The live version received a nomination for Best Melodic Rap Performance at the 65th Annual Grammy Awards.

Background and release

Original 
In May 2021, Latto released the song "The Biggest" following the announcement of her stage name changing from Mulatto to Latto. Released in September, "Big Energy" was first premiered at the 2021 MTV Video Music Awards, where Latto performed three songs in short segments throughout the show. Latto also promoted the song with performances at the 2021 BET Hip Hop Awards and on Late Night with Seth Meyers. In April 2022, she performed a medley of "Big Energy" and "Sunshine" on The Tonight Show Starring Jimmy Fallon.

Remix 
Latto has stated that she first conceived the idea of having American singer Mariah Carey on the remix back in November 2021. Although she was her first option, Latto "did not think [she] could get her realistically".

On March 25, 2022, Latto revealed that Mariah Carey and record producer DJ Khaled would be featured on her "Big Energy" remix, set to be released March 28, 2022. This announcement came days after speculation on who was to be featured on the song's remix grew as Latto released her album's tracklist, blurring the featured artist's name. A few days later, on March 25, Latto ultimately revealed through the single cover art that the blurred artist would be Mariah Carey, after a Twitter exchange between the two artists, which further increased speculation.

Recording and production

Original
Latto told Billboard that in the lyrics she took the "masculine, trendy 'big dick energy' quote" from social media and made it a concept that all genders can have and take it deeper than just a sexual aspect." Latto added, "I wanted it to be empowering. It's an aura that you carry and a confidence. It’s just an overall vibe and when you walk in the room, you have 'big energy' and no one can tell you otherwise". Her A&R representatives first played her the beat during a studio session in Los Angeles, which she felt keen on but perceived it as musically different and "out of [her] comfort zone". Latto described the writing process as a dynamic collaborative effort, collecting different opinions  with "people in the room [to] bounce ideas off of each other... talking out loud, playing the beat out loud. It wasn't a sit-down-and-write type of thing... and I was asking the girls in the room, 'What does big energy mean to you?'

The song was produced by Dr. Luke and Vaughn Oliver. The funk-infused pop and pop-rap song heavily samples the 1981 single, "Genius of Love" by Tom Tom Club, one of the most sampled rhythm tracks of the 1980s, particularly within the hip hop and R&B genre. Notable sample uses of that single include Dr. Jeckyl & Mr. Hyde's "Genius Rap" in 1981, Grandmaster Flash and the Furious Five's "It's Nasty" in 1982, Mariah Carey's "Fantasy" in 1995, and The X-Ecutioners' "Genius of Love 2002" in 2002. Latto stated that the sample was a new sound for her that "might cause controversy", but felt confident that its catchiness would bring a new audience and wider fanbase to her career. In another interview, however, Latto declared that she wants to avoid the mainstream public thinking that her music catalogue sounds similar to the pop-leaning "Big Energy", saying that she prioritizes rap music with different composition and that "that's not where [her] heart is".

Remix
In the Mariah Carey remix, Carey supplies her signature whistle notes to the intro of the song, while Latto raps the first verse. Carey follows with an interpolation of the opening verse of her song "Fantasy", and then sings the post-chorus that merges both songs. Musically, the remix has been described as a blend of pop and R&B.

Critical reception

Original
Melinda Fakuade of Rolling Stone wrote about Latto experimenting with the pop sound, saying it is "a conscious attempt of a creative risk", and perceiving "Big Energy" as "hyper-curated for the TikTok generation". In Clash, Ana Lamond said that the "playful" single channels "colourful nostalgia with a lush, groovy finish," that welcomes a "pop-centric commercial appeal" on the album. Billboards Rania Aniftos wrote that Latto put a "femenine, empowering spin" on the social media phrase for the "energetic" track. Jordan Bassett from NME wrote that the song is "a dumb, fun summer anthem wrapped up in a squelchy sample" that is "the feel-good highpoint" of the album. Aaron Williams of Uproxx said that the "spunky" track represents a departure from her previously established sound to a "lighthearted" song. In a mixed review, Tom Breihan in Stereogum opined the single "hypercharged" the strategy of using nostalgic beats, and called it a "cynical and obvious hit-chasing attempt", further adding from its "glitzy video" to its "gleaming hooks" is "pure product". Pitchforks Tyra Triche thought the song sounds "almost like a jingle", and felt unconvinced by the lyrics and the "bit dated" meme it references. Quincy of Ratings Game Music rated the song 3 out of 5 stars and wrote that it was "too cheesy" for him.

Remix
In Variety, Ellise Shafer called the Mariah Carey remix a "crossover of epic proportions", as both Latto's "Big Energy" and Carey's "Fantasy" sample the same track. Glenn Rowley of Billboard called it a "sparkling collab". Uproxx's Caitlin White considered it a "bonafide R&B/pop hit". Quincy of Ratings Game Music rated the remix 2 out of 5 stars and wrote that Carey "tastefully upstaged" Latto's raps.

"Big Energy" (Remix) was nominated for the Song of the Summer Award at the 2022 MTV Video Music Awards, earning Carey her first nomination at the ceremony in fourteen years since "Touch My Body" in 2008.

Commercial performance

Original
"Big Energy" debuted at number 88 on the US Billboard Hot 100, for the week dated November 6, 2021, becoming Latto's highest-charting song on the chart since "Bitch from da Souf", which peaked at number 95 in 2020. Supported by the release of the remix, the song reached number three in its 23rd week on the chart, becoming Latto's first top 10 entry. It became the highest-charting solo song by a female rapper since Cardi B's "Up" in March 2021. "Big Energy" spent four weeks in the top five. The song also reached number one on the US  Hot R&B/Hip-Hop Songs and Hot Rap Songs, a first for Latto in both of them. It topped each for two weeks.

Latto became the first female rapper since Lizzo (2019) to reach number one on the Radio Songs chart. Latto also became the first female rapper to reach number one on the Mainstream Top 40, Urban, and Rhythmic radio formats with the same song. It marked the sixth song by a female artist to accomplish this, following Mariah Carey's "We Belong Together" (2005), Mary J. Blige's "Be Without You" (2005), Beyoncé's "Irreplaceable" (2006), Alicia Keys' "No One" (2007), and Rihanna's "Rude Boy" (2010). Among component charts, the song became Latto's first top 10 on the US Streaming Songs chart. The track placed at No. 7 on the Billboard year-end chart for 2022.

Remix
The remix with Mariah Carey featuring DJ Khaled reached number one on the US Digital Song Sales chart, becoming Latto's first chart-topper, Carey's fourth, and Khaled's third. In Australia, it peaked at number six, becoming Latto's first top-ten hit there, Khaled's fifth, and Carey's 18th (being also her first song to hit the top-ten in nine years since "#Beautiful" in 2013; and her highest-charting single since the aforementioned song).

In the United Kingdom, the remix peaked at number 21 on the UK Singles chart, becoming Latto's first top-40 hit there, Khaled's eighth, and Carey's 40th (being also her first song since "#Beautiful" to hit the top-40 in the country; and her highest-charting song there since "I Want to Know What Love Is" in 2009). In Ireland, as peaking at number 20, "Big Energy" (Remix) became Latto's first top-20 hit there, Khaled's sixth, and Carey's 22nd (also being both her first song in 14 years to hit the top-20 in the country and her highest-charting song since "Touch My Body" in 2008).

Music video  
The song's video was directed by Arrad. It was released alongside the song. According to Complex, the video "capitalizes on the theme of chance", as the clip's leading man gives it a try at the lottery, while Latto is dancing and singing against a "casino backdrop", and the man gets struck "by what seems to be Cupid's arrow". The concept stems from the Latto/lotto wordplay. The video features a scene of Latto wearing a costume in the colors of a lady beetle, represented in the cover art for the single.

Live performances 
Latto first performed "Big Energy" in September 2021, prior to the song's release, at the 2021 MTV Video Music Awards, where she also performed "Bitch from da Souf" and "Muwop". In October 2021, she performed the song at the 2021 BET Hip Hop Awards. In November 2021, Latto made her late-night debut on Late Night with Seth Meyers, performing "Big Energy". In April 2022, Latto performed the aforementioned song and "Sunshine" on The Tonight Show Starring Jimmy Fallon. A month later, Latto performed "Big Energy" at the 2022 Billboard Music Awards. She performed the remix of "Big Energy" at the 2022 BET Awards, with a surprise appearance by Mariah Carey.

Personnel
Credits adapted from Tidal.

 Latto – songwriting, vocals
 Mariah Carey – songwriting, vocals (remix only)
 DJ Khaled – songwriting, vocals (remix only)
 Lukasz Gottwald – co-production, songwriting
 Vaughn Oliver – co-production, songwriting
 A1 LaFlare – songwriting
 Jaucquez Lowe – songwriting
 Randall Hammers – songwriting
 Tina Weymouth – songwriting
 Chris Frantz – songwriting
 Steven Stanley – songwriting
 Adrian Belew – songwriting
 Dave Hall – songwriting (remix only)
 Joey Galvan – engineer
 Kalani Thompson – engineer
 Brian Garten – engineer (remix only)
 Dale Becker – mastering engineer
 Clint Gibbs – mixing engineer
 Connor Hedge – engineer assistant
 Fili Filizzola – engineer assistant
 Hector Vega – engineer assistant
 Tyler Sheppard – engineer assistant
 Chloe Angelides – background vocals

Charts

Weekly charts

Year-end charts

Certifications

Release history

References

External links 

2021 songs
2021 singles
Latto songs
Pop-rap songs
RCA Records singles
Songs written by Adrian Belew
Songs written by Chris Frantz
Songs written by Steven Stanley
Songs written by Tina Weymouth
Songs written by Latto
Songs with feminist themes
American funk songs
American pop songs
Songs written by Dr. Luke
Song recordings produced by Dr. Luke